Rajkumar Pal is an Indian politician from Uttar Pradesh in the Apna Dal (Sonelal) party. He was elected as a member of the Uttar Pradesh Legislative Assembly from Pratapgarh on 24 October 2019. Now he is state president of Apna dal s. Rajkumar Pal belongs to a farmer family. After a long struggle finally he became MLA of Sadar constituency in by-election 2019.

The National president of Apna dal S and state union minister Smt Anupriya Patel faithing upon him decided to make him state president of Ads in May 2022.

References

Living people
Members of the Uttar Pradesh Legislative Assembly
Apna Dal (Sonelal) politicians
Year of birth missing (living people)